Doorly is a surname. Notable people with the surname include:

Edward Doorly (1868–1950), Irish Roman Catholic bishop
Eleanor Doorly (1880–1950), British writer
Henry Doorly (1879–1961), American journalist, newspaper editor and publisher
Stokely Doorly (1882–1954), Trinidad and Tobago clergyman
Wiltshire Doorly (died 1932), Trinidad and Tobago clergyman

See also
Mount Doorly, a mountain of Victoria Land, Antarctica
Doorley, a surname